The Walther Rathenau Institut, Stiftung für internationale Politik is a non-party and non-profit foundation based in Berlin. It is named after Walther Rathenau, the German-Jewish foreign minister of the Weimar Republic.

Aims and purposes 
The foundation celebrates the life and works of Walther Rathenau, a successful industrial, essayist, and foreign policymaker who was born in Berlin on September the 29th, 1867. The foundation’s goal is to make his dedication to democratic values, international understanding and tolerance widely known to the broad public. For this purpose the foundation fosters political education in remembrance of Walther Rathenau, especially by means of contributions and research projects in the field of foreign policy. Moreover, policy studies are performed on current Germany-related subjects that reflect the liberal spirit of Walther Rathenau.

Walther-Rathenau-Preis 

The Walther Rathenau Institut annually awards the Walther-Rathenau-Preis acknowledging outstanding work in regard to foreign policy. The prize, a medal with Walther Rathenau’s portrait, is presented at a celebration in Berlin.

Award winners
	2008: Hans-Dietrich Genscher (Germany)
	2009: Shimon Peres (Israel)
	2010: Hillary Clinton (United States)
	2011: Donald Tusk (Poland)
	2012: United Nations High Commissioner for Refugees
	2014: Mark Rutte (Netherlands)
       2015: Queen Rania of Jordan (Jordan)
       2018: Guido Westerwelle (Germany)

History and structure 
The Walther Rathenau Institut was founded in Berlin at the beginning of 2008 by and on initiative of the publicist and entrepreneur Michael Gotthelf.

Board
	Werner Hoyer (chairman)
	Karl Otto Pöhl, former President of the Bundesbank (founding member)
	Hartmuth A. Jung (founding member)
	Christian Lindner
       Martin Biesel

Advisory board
       Michael A. Gotthelf (founder and chairman of the advisory board)
	Günther Nonnenmacher
	Wolfgang Ischinger
	Samuel Skoblo

Management
       Mikolaj Ciechanowicz

See also 
 Walther Rathenau
 Rathenau Institute

References

External links

Official website of the Walther Rathenau Institut

Non-profit organisations based in Berlin
Foundations based in Germany
Cultural organisations based in Germany
Walther Rathenau